The Wolf River is a river in Harrison, Hancock and Pearl River counties, Mississippi, in the United States.

It was named for the presence of the red wolf.

See also
List of rivers of Mississippi

References

Landforms of Harrison County, Mississippi
Landforms of Hancock County, Mississippi
Landforms of Pearl River County, Mississippi
Rivers of Mississippi